Peach Creek is a stream in southeast DeKalb County in the U.S. state of Missouri. It is a tributary of Grindstone Creek.

Peach Creek most likely was so named due to the presence of nearby peach trees.

See also
List of rivers of Missouri

References

Rivers of DeKalb County, Missouri
Rivers of Missouri